Forest Hill Chase Shopping Centre is a major regional shopping centre located in the eastern suburb of Forest Hill in Melbourne, Australia. Owned by Blackstone and managed by JLL, the centre is among the oldest in Victoria, opening on 30 June 1964 as an outdoor strip shopping centre, before being developed over the years into its current three level indoor form. Currently, Forest Hill Chase contains 200 stores and over 3500 free car parking spaces. The centre has three supermarkets, two discount department stores and some smaller anchor stores. The architecture is distinguished by a roof of polycarbonate construction with a barrel vault design.

History
Forest Hill opened as a strip mall shopping centre in June 1964, this included the first Safeway (now Woolworths) store in Australia, before gradually growing during the 1970s and 1980s with larger stores, a multi-deck car park adjacent to Canterbury Road, the development of a Woolworths supermarket and an enclosed two-storey building at the southern end of the centre where Big W resided along with Harris Scarfe and Woolworths that also currently resides in that area. 

Forest Hill's conversion from a hybrid (strip mall / indoor) centre to a fully indoor site began in June 1987 with the demolition of the strip mall section, and the construction of a three-storey extension to the existing building, which housed major tenants including Coles, Venture, Kmart and Hoyts, and was completed in 1989.

During circa 1997, Harris Scarfe was downsized from its two level form to occupying only level 1, to allow a new Big W store to open in the now vacant space on level 2. An AMF (now Zone Bowling) and children's play centre Run Riot was constructed on Level 3 a couple of years later. 

In December 2004, Melbourne businessman Maurice Alter sold the Forest Hill Chase shopping centre to listed retail property trust CFS Gandel, managed by Colonial First State Property, for $214.5 million. The sale was close to being the largest national (Australian) retail property deal of the year and it included property management rights and the potential for redevelopment. At the time of purchase, Colonial First State Property fund manager Bevan Towning ruled out any immediate major redevelopment plans, saying the intention was to change the centre's retailing mix by introducing the same national brands it had at its other shopping centres, Chadstone and Northland. They also wanted to revitalize the centre and give it a "new look".

2007–2012 major redevelopments

Levels one and two (2006−2007)
In the biggest redevelopment of the centre since 1989, levels one and two of the centre were completely refurbished in 2007. Major milestones of the redevelopment program, which started in December 2006, are as follows:

 The Relocation of Kmart Tyre & Auto Service from next to the centre entrance to the former Kmart, to a new free standing site in Pacific Way, which was completed in March 2007.
 The refurbishment of the level one and two interior malls, with new floor tiling laid, removal of the traditional gold balustrades with modern steel balustrades installed, and the removal of the stairwells at the south of the centre near Big W.
 The level two toilets were fully refurbished, completed in June 2007.
 The Mahoneys Road entrance was upgraded, with the existing canopy replaced and upgraded with a terrace installed on level 3 for use by The Chase Hotel, which was completed by June 2007.
 Kmart's permanent closure on 31 January 2007 and subsequent conversion to Target, which opened in September 2007.
 The refurbishment and extension of the food court, completed in September 2007.

Level three (2010–2011)
The third level was expanded and refurbished during the second half of 2010, complementing the earlier refurbishment of the other levels of the centre and introducing a number of new tenants. The redeveloped level officially re-opened on 15 December 2010 with some retailers opening earlier or later in the following months.

 The refurbishment of level 3, including mall reconfiguration, expansion and renovation, new escalators between levels two and three, and a new centre entry to a new car park, completed in December 2010.
 The construction of an additional deck of car parking located west of Hoyts above the existing Target/Coles multi-deck car park, including 317 spaces, opening on 15 December 2010.
 Establishing a new 'Entertainment and Dining' precinct with a refurbished Hoyts cinema, three new restaurants as well as new minor anchor retailers JB Hi-Fi, Rebel and gymnasium Fit n Fast.

Replacing Myer and new fresh food market (2012)
In 2012, Harris Scarfe returned to the centre and spent more than $2 million redeveloping the store in the area previously occupied by Myer.

The centre also expanded its fresh food market on level one, which included a new Aldi supermarket on top of the Canterbury Road multi deck car park, which caused a small increase in undercover parking.  A new refurbished bus zone was also built as a result. (A temporary bus zone was constructed adjacent to Kmart Tyre & Auto during construction).

Minor improvements (2013)
The glass lift in the food court that travels from the basement car park through to level 3 was replaced, as the existing lift was too small, causing heavy congestion as it became the only fully accessible way to move between levels 2 and 3 after a past level 3 redevelopment. The expanded lift is now operating and carries up to 26 people. New facade and centre entrance treatments were also installed along the Canterbury Road car park frontage and around the Level 2 Best & less centre entry.

Renovations and re-configurations (2017–2019) 
In late 2017, the latest renovations started, which were to completely revamp the third floor, and partially renovate the second floor.

 The east wing of the Level 2 mall, which formerly housed Dimmeys and a few other retailers, was closed down for several months and completely renovated and re-configured. Dimmeys moved to a smaller location near the Level 1 food court (which later closed down permanently) with JB Hi-Fi and Rebel moving from their former Level 3 tenancies. The escalators linking Level 2 and Level 3 were also removed to allow for more retail space.
 In 2018, Big W closed down, with a new TK Maxx store occupying part of the available space, with its entrance opposite the newly re-located JB Hi-Fi and Rebel stores. A new Medical Centre and Child Care Centre will occupy the remainder of the space of the former Big W.
 In 2019, Level 3 was renovated, with the space left behind by JB Hi-Fi and Rebel being converted into more dining retailers, with the whole level getting a refurbishment and being branded as "The Loft". Zone Bowling (formerly AMF) and Timezone were also renovated to combine the two tenancies together with a new look. A new glass lift was also installed near the travelator located outside Woolworths with access to all levels.

References

External links

Shopping centres in Melbourne
Shopping malls established in 1964
1964 establishments in Australia
Buildings and structures in the City of Whitehorse